The men's 1500 metres event  at the 1976 European Athletics Indoor Championships was held on 21 and 22 February in Munich.

Medalists

Results

Heats
First 4 from each heat (Q) qualified directly for the final.

Final

References

1500 metres at the European Athletics Indoor Championships
1500